Tillmitsch is a municipality in the district of Leibnitz in Styria, Austria.

References

Cities and towns in Leibnitz District